Trouble is the debut album by American singer Akon, released in on June 29, 2004. The album contains Akon's worldwide hit single, "Lonely", which was his commercial breakthrough. However, the release of "Locked Up" propelled Akon to sign a record deal. "Gunshot (Fiesta Riddim)" was released as promotional single on May 11, 2004. The album performed well in the United Kingdom where it peaked at No. 1 on the UK Album Chart. Trouble sold 25,000 copies in the first week, and certified Platinum by the RIAA in the United States and has sold 1.6 million copies.

Background
Although "Lonely" offered the album's best option in terms of commercial breakthrough, SRC Records A&R Jerome Foster told HitQuarters that "Locked Up" was chosen because he wanted to break Akon in the streets first and work towards a cross-over. "Locked Up" is a street record. I thought that was the place for us to start to get a fan-base, knowing that we had a record like "Lonely", which was more commercial, to follow it." The final appearance on the Billboard 200 was for the chart dated November 26, 2005. The album first appeared on the UK Album Chart on February 12, 2005. It slowly climbed up the chart before finally reaching the summit on April 30, 2005. It then spent two non-consecutive weeks at #1 on the UK Album Chart. Trouble is by far Akon's most successful album in the United Kingdom to date.

Release

When originally released in 2004, the UK version of the album contained thirteen tracks, whilst US versions of the album only contained twelve, omitting the song "Ghetto". The digital version of the US album includes the bonus track "Kill The Dance". In 2005, the UK version of the album was re-issued with additional bonus tracks "Gunshot" and a remix of "Locked Up". In Japan, the bonus tracks were the same, however, the track "Ghetto" was once again omitted. For its release across Europe in late 2004, the album was completely altered, with remixes of "Belly Dancer", "Lonely" and "Don't Let Up" replacing the original versions, issued in the US and UK. The European version also removes the track "I Wont" and replaces it with a brand new track, "Easy Road". In 2005, the album was reissued, this time with a bonus disc containing two brand new tracks, two remixes and six collaborations between Akon and other artists. In Europe, the bonus disc contained eleven tracks, adding another remix of "Ghetto" as track one. In 2006, all US versions of the album were removed from iTunes, replacing them with the European version. However, the European edition loses the track "Easy Road" and replaces it with the original track "I Wont", and also includes the US digital bonus track "Kill The Dance", instead of the remix of "Locked Up".

Track listing

Charts

Weekly charts

Year-end charts

Certifications

References

Akon albums
Albums produced by Akon
Albums produced by Disco D
2004 debut albums
Universal Records albums

hu:Trouble
pt:Trouble (álbum)
sv:Trouble (musikalbum)